Dany Franchi (born 3 February 1990 in Genoa, Italy) is an Italian electric blues guitarist, singer and songwriter. Franchi has recorded three albums to date, with the first two crediting his backing band. His third studio album, Problem Child (2018), peaked at number 4 in the Billboard Top Blues Albums Chart.

Anson Funderburgh stated that "Dany is one of my favorite young blues artists. He has an exciting fresh approach to the music while keeping it honest."

Life and career
Franchi was born in Genoa, Italy. In 2008, he graduated with a degree in music gained in Milan, and soon thereafter commenced his professional career in music.  In 2011, he won the Blues for Youth Award in his homeland. His debut effort entitled, Free Feeling, was released in 2012. The collection featured his fellows Italians, Paolo Bonfanti and Guitar Ray, along with the 2007 International Blues Challenge winner and Ohio resident Sean Carney.

In February 2014, Franchi relocated to the United States and record his second album I Believe, was recorded in Cadiz, Ohio, with Carney producing the album. In January, 2016, Franchi and his backing band reached the semi-final of the International Blues Challenge in Memphis, Tennessee. Later the same year, he played at the Dallas International Guitar Festival. Between 2016 and 2017, Franchi appeared at other blues festivals, including the Doheny Blues Festival (California), Blues from the Top (Colorado, United States), Blues 'n Jazz Rallye (Rapperswil, Switzerland), Olsztyn Blues Festival (Olsztyn, Poland), and the Augustibluus Festival (Haapsalu, Estonia). and many others.

In February 2017, Anson Funderburgh and Don Ritter, agreed to produce Franchi's third album Problem Child.  The recording took place at Stuart Sullivan’s Wire Recording Studio in Austin, Texas. The album was released on May 18, 2018, on Kara Grainger's own label, Station House Records. The collection contained 13 tracks, mostly written by Franchi.  Three of the tracks were cover versions.  The instrumental "Sensation" was a re-wording of Freddie King's "Sen-Sa-Shun". The others included Eddie Taylor’s "Big Town Playboy," and the Willie Dixon and Little Walter penned "Everything Gonna Be Alright."

Problem Child, peaked at number 4 in the Billboard Top Blues Albums Chart in June 2018.

Equipment
Franchi uses GHS strings on his Fender Stratocaster guitar.

Discography

See also
List of electric blues musicians

References

External links
Official website
Interview with Franchi

1990 births
Living people
Italian blues guitarists
Italian male singer-songwriters
Electric blues musicians
Musicians from Genoa
21st-century Italian male  singers
21st-century guitarists
Italian blues musicians